Hubbard Rively Yetman (August 28, 1847 – October 18, 1924) was an American educator, real estate and insurance agent, and politician from New York.

Life 
Yetman was born on August 28, 1847, in Englishtown, New Jersey, the son of William Arthur Yetman and Mary Amy Rively. He attended school at Monmouth Hall in Freehold.

When Yetman was barely 15, he enlisted in the 14th New Jersey Volunteer Infantry to fight in the Civil War. He served as a drummer for a while, and then was appointed adjutant's clerk. The 14th was in the Army of the Potomac, and Yetman was in all the engagements. He was wounded once, but stayed with the 14th until it mustered out of service at the end of the War.

After the War, he moved to Tottenville, Staten Island, New York. He taught public school there for 15 years, was elected justice of the peace for several terms, and represented insurance companies.

In 1888, Yetman was elected to the New York State Assembly as a Democrat, representing Richmond County. He served in the Assembly in 1889, 1892, and 1893.

Yetman was elected School Commissioner in 1893, but declined the position due to a contest for the office. He was elected as the last town supervisor for Westfield in 1897. After the consolidation of New York City, he was made the Superintendent of Schools for the Borough of Richmond. He resigned from the position in 1902.

Yetman married Sarah Virginia Joline in 1870. Their children were Laura Blatchford, Arthur Hubbard, Grace Hazleton, and William Joline. He was the Commander of Lenhart Post No. 163, Grand Army of the Republic.

Yetman died at home on October 18, 1924. He was buried in Bethel Cemetery.

References

External links 
 The Political Graveyard
 

1847 births
1924 deaths
American real estate brokers
People from Englishtown, New Jersey
Democratic Party members of the New York State Assembly
Union Army soldiers
School superintendents in New York (state)
19th-century American politicians
19th-century American educators
20th-century American educators
Military personnel from New Jersey
Educators from New York City
Town supervisors in New York (state)
Educators from New Jersey
Schoolteachers from New York (state)
American businesspeople in insurance
Schoolteachers from New Jersey
20th-century American businesspeople
Businesspeople from New York City
Politicians from Staten Island
Grand Army of the Republic officials
People from Tottenville, Staten Island